There have been two baronetcies created for persons with the surname Warner, one in the Baronetage of England and one in the Baronetage of the United Kingdom. One creation is extant as of 2010.

The Warner Baronetcy, of Parham in the County of Suffolk, was created in the Baronetage of the United Kingdom on 16 July 1660 for John Warner. The title became extinct on his death in 1705.

The Warner Baronetcy, of Brettenham in the County of Suffolk, was created in the Baronetage of the United Kingdom on 9 July 1910 for Courtenay Warner, member of parliament for North Somerset and Lichfield. The second baronet was High Sheriff of Suffolk between 1947 and 1948 and a Colonel in the British Army, who was awarded an MC and a DSO in World War I.

Warner baronets, of Parham (1660)
Sir John Warner, 1st Baronet (–1705)

Warner baronets, of Brettenham (1910)
Sir (Thomas) Courtenay Theydon Warner, 1st Baronet (1857–1934)
Sir Edward Courtenay Thomas Warner, 2nd Baronet (1886–1955)
Sir (Edward Courtenay) Henry Warner, 3rd Baronet (1922–2011)
Sir Philip Courtenay Thomas Warner, 4th Baronet (born 1951)
The heir apparent is Charles Thomas Courtenay Warner (born 1989)

Notes

References
Kidd, Charles, Williamson, David (editors). Debrett's Peerage and Baronetage (1990 edition). New York: St Martin's Press, 1990, 

Baronetcies in the Baronetage of the United Kingdom
Extinct baronetcies in the Baronetage of England